Fly Zone is the second mixtape by American rapper and producer Le1f. It was released on Greedhead Music and Camp & Street on January 28, 2013.

Critical reception

At Metacritic, which assigns a weighted average score out of 100 to reviews from mainstream critics, Fly Zone received an average score of 78, based on 5 reviews, indicating "generally favorable reviews".

Miles Raymer of Pitchfork called the mixtape "an epically audacious record, boiling down to essentially a 13-track demand from Le1f to be allowed access to a mainstream audience without sacrificing a shred of the identity that sets him apart from nearly every rapper a mainstream audience has been drawn to." Mike Diver of BBC stated that "Fly Zone is streamlined, its production consistently excellent despite numerous contributors, none of whom work more than a single track."

Accolades

Track listing

References

External links
 

2013 mixtape albums
Leif (rapper) albums
Greedhead Music albums